Zareen Riaz is a Pakistani politician who had been a Member of the Provincial Assembly of Khyber Pakhtunkhwa from May 2013 to May 2018.

Education
She has a Bachelor of Arts degree.

Political career
She was elected to the Provincial Assembly of Khyber Pakhtunkhwa as a candidate of Pakistan Tehreek-e-Insaf on a reserved seat for women in 2013 Pakistani general election.

In May 2016, Riaz joined a resolution to establish a Women's Caucus in the Provincial Assembly of Khyber Pakhtunkhwa. She also joined a resolution to declare 8 July as Charity Day in honour of Abdul Sattar Edhi.

References

Living people
Pakistan Tehreek-e-Insaf politicians
Year of birth missing (living people)